This is a list of the municipalities in the autonomous community of Extremadura, Spain.

See also

Geography of Spain
List of Spanish cities